Alexander Gennadyevich Zaitsev (born 16 June 1952 in Leningrad) is a retired pair skater who represented the Soviet Union. With partner Irina Rodnina, he is a two-time (1976, 1980) Olympic champion, six-time World champion and seven-time European champion. They were coached by Stanislav Zhuk and later Tatiana Tarasova in Moscow.

From 1973 to 1980 they won every event they entered and are, to date, the most decorated pair team of all time.

Career 
In April 1972, Zaitsev was recommended by Stanislav Zhuk to Irina Rodnina as a potential partner. She was already a four-time World champion and 1972 Olympic gold medalist with her previous partner Alexei Ulanov, who had left her to skate with Lyudmila Smirnova. Zaitsev was three years younger than Rodnina and was much less seasoned but learned quickly. He was from Leningrad (Saint Petersburg) while she was from Moscow.

Rodnina / Zaitsev's music stopped during their short program at the 1973 World Championships, possibly due to a Czech worker acting in retaliation for the suppression of the Prague Spring. Known for intense concentration, they finished the program in silence, earning a standing ovation and a gold medal upon completion, ahead of Smirnova / Ulanov, whom they again defeated in 1974.

In 1974, Rodnina / Zaitsev left Zhuk, with whom the working relationship had become strained, to train with Tatiana Tarasova. They won six consecutive World titles together, as well as seven European gold medals, and won their first Olympic title together in 1976. Rodnina / Zaitsev did not compete during the 1978–79 season because she was pregnant with their son, who was born on February 23, 1979. They returned in 1980 to capture their second Olympic title together and Rodnina's third. They then retired from competitive skating.

After retiring from competition, Zaitsev became a coach and for a time was involved in the administration of the sport.

Personal life 
Rodnina and Zaitsev were married in April 1975. Their son, also named Alexander, was born in 1979. The pair later divorced.

Results 

Pairs with Irina Rodnina

See also 
 USSR at the Winter Olympics

References

External links 
 Rodnina and Zaitsev pair profile

Navigation 

1952 births
Living people
Communist Party of the Soviet Union members
Honoured Masters of Sport of the USSR
Recipients of the Order of the Red Banner of Labour
Russian male pair skaters
Soviet male pair skaters
Olympic figure skaters of the Soviet Union
Figure skaters at the 1976 Winter Olympics
Figure skaters at the 1980 Winter Olympics
Olympic gold medalists for the Soviet Union
Figure skaters from Saint Petersburg
Olympic medalists in figure skating
World Figure Skating Championships medalists
European Figure Skating Championships medalists
Medalists at the 1976 Winter Olympics
Medalists at the 1980 Winter Olympics